Dmitry Medvedev's Cabinet may refer to:

 Dmitry Medvedev's First Cabinet, the Russian government led by Dmitry Medvedev from 2012 to 2018
 Dmitry Medvedev's Second Cabinet, the Russian government led by Dmitry Medvedev from 2018 to 2020